

Events
Summer – New York Police break up the last of the Manhattan street gangs, including the Hudson Dusters, from The Battery to Spuyten Duyvil. Many of these former gang members would become employed as labor sluggers. Street gangs would become non-existent in New York until the release of "Kid Dropper" Nathan Kaplan and Johnny Spanish the following year.  
The Mafia-Camorra War begins in New York between the Manhattan Sicilian and Neapolitan Brooklyn Mafia. 
September 7 – Nicholas Morello, leader of the Morello crime family, is killed with bodyguard Charles Ubriaco outside a Navy Street restaurant while arriving at peace negotiations with rival Pellegrino Morano.

Arts and literature
Poor Little Peppina (film)

Births 
April 1 – Gus Alex, Chicago Outfit member
June 10 – Peter Joseph LoCascio "Mr. Bread", New York (Lower East Side) syndicate mobster involved in narcotics

Deaths
September 7 – Nicholas Morello, Morello crime family leader 
September 7 – Charles Ubriaco, Morello crime family member

Years in organized crime
Organized crime